The 2021 National Premier League is the 47th season of the National Premier League, the top division football competition in Jamaica. The season kicked off on 26 June 2021. The season operated with a shortened schedule due to impacts from the COVID-19 pandemic, following the cancellation of the 2019–20 season.

Teams
In May 2021, the Jamaican Football Federation announced that the National Premier League would resume, playing a shortened season between June and September, competed by the 12 teams from the previous season In June 2021, UWI F.C. announced it would withdraw ahead of the 2021 season due to the modified schedule conflicting with other player commitments; leaving 11 teams in the competition.

Note: UWI F.C. withdrew prior to beginning of season.

Regular season

Format
The 2021 season will operate under a modified compressed schedule where each team will play each other once during the preliminary round of the competition. At the end of the preliminary round, teams will be separated into two tiers with the bottom six teams playing each other once in a round-robin format to determine rank. For the top tier, the top two teams will automatically advance to the semi-finals, while the other four teams will play for the remaining semi-finals spots. No team will face relegation during the 2021 season.

Four venues have been approved for matches:
Independence Park (preferred)
Sabina Park (preferred)
Stadium East (alternate)
Captain Horace Burrell Centre of Excellence (alternate)

Captain Horace Burrell Centre of Excellence was selected to host all five matches kicking off the 2021 season.

League table

Results

Playoffs

Bracket 
Source:

Results 
Source:

Quarterfinals

Mount Pleasant progresses 4-2 on aggregates.

Tivoli Gardens progresses 4-0 on aggregates.

Semifinals 

Cavalier progresses 1-0 on aggregate

Waterhouse progresses 2-1 on aggregates

Third Place Game 
Tivoli Gardens won 1-1(4-3 on penalties)

Final 

Cavalier won 1-1(5-4 on penalties)

Top goalscorers

References

External links
Premier League Jamaica

National Premier League seasons
1
Jamaica